Lairo Water is a surface water body known as an ayre situated on the western coast of Shapinsay in the Orkney Islands. This brackish water body is separated by a narrow bar of land from Veantro Bay. This wetland is an area where a variety of bird species may be found. Hogan has suggested that the Lairo Water may have been a source of subsistence food for prehistoric inhabitants of Shapinsay at Burroughston Broch.

See also
The Ouse
Quholm
Vasa Loch

Footnotes

Landforms of Orkney
Shapinsay
Wetlands of Scotland